M'Drắk is a township and capital of M'Drắk District, Đắk Lắk Province, Vietnam.

References

Communes of Đắk Lắk province
Populated places in Đắk Lắk province
District capitals in Vietnam